Mats Wilander defeated Ivan Lendl in the final, 6–1, 6–4, 6–4 to win the men's singles tennis title at the 1983 Australian Open.

Johan Kriek was the two-time defending champion, but lost in the quarterfinals to Wilander.

Seeds
The seeded players are listed below. Mats Wilander is the champion; others show the round in which they were eliminated.

  Ivan Lendl (final)
  John McEnroe (semifinals)
  Mats Wilander (champion)
  Eliot Teltscher (quarterfinals)
  Johan Kriek (quarterfinals)
  Vitas Gerulaitis (second round)
  Tomáš Šmíd (quarterfinals)
  Anders Järryd (fourth round)
  Henrik Sundström (second round)
  Scott Davis (withdrew)
  Brian Teacher (third round)
  Hank Pfister (second round)
  Chris Lewis (third round)
  Steve Denton (third round)
  Tim Mayotte (semifinals)
  Paul McNamee (fourth round)

Qualifying

Draw

Final eight

Section 1

Section 2

Section 3

Section 4

Section 5

Section 6

Section 7

Section 8

External links
 Association of Tennis Professionals (ATP) – 1983 Australian Open Men's Singles draw
 1983 Australian Open – Men's draws and results at the International Tennis Federation

Mens singles
Australian Open (tennis) by year – Men's singles